1986 Masters may refer to:
1986 Masters Tournament, golf
1986 Masters (snooker)
1986 Nabisco Masters, tennis